Monastero di Lanzo is a comune (municipality) in the Metropolitan City of Turin in the Italian region Piedmont, located about 35 km northwest of Turin.

Monastero di Lanzo borders the following municipalities: Locana, Cantoira, Coassolo Torinese, Ceres, Pessinetto, and Lanzo Torinese.

References

Cities and towns in Piedmont